The Battle of Nà Sản was fought between French Union forces and the Nationalist forces of the Việt Minh at Nà Sản, Sơn La Province, during the First Indochina War for control of the T’ai region (Northwest territory).

Background

Military situation

Battle of Hòa Bình
In the Fall of 1950, General Marcel Carpentier decided to withdraw all military forces from Hòa Bình, capital of the Muong region. In November 1951, General De Lattre, Carpentier's replacement, launched an offensive operation against the Việt Minh in Hòa Bình to reclaim an area he saw as vital for France's future in Indochina. According to De Lattre, capturing Hòa Bình would cut the enemy's supply line between Thanh Hóa and Việt Bắc. Psychologically, reclaiming the province would gain support from the Mường, who had supported neither side, but were leaning more toward the Franco-Vietnamese side. In November 1951, De Lattre mobilized 10 infantry and eight airborne battalions to mount a decisive operation. Võ Nguyên Giáp counterattacked with three regular divisions, two independent regiments, and regional support troops. The two sides fought hard for Hòa Bình. At the height of the Battle of Hòa Bình, Giáp had 40 battalions fighting his enemies at different locations throughout the province. In January 1952, French forces were winning when De Lattre had to return to France for cancer treatment and General Salan was appointed to take his place. General Salan, who saw the province as an area that was hard to support and to defend, decided to withdraw his troops (Operation Amarante). On 22 February, French troops successfully withdrew from Hòa Bình and regrouped in Xuan Mai two days later.

T'ai region
Eight months after having successfully defended Hòa Binh, General Giáp attacked Nghĩa Lộ in the T'ai region which he failed to take a year earlier. General Giáp used four regular divisions (308th, 312th, 316th and artillery division 351st) to attack the province's southeast and the regional regiment 148th to guard the northwest side against reinforcements. In 10 days, Việt Minh forces not only took Nghĩa Lộ but also seized part of Sơn La and Lai Châu from French control. To avoid further losses, General Salan launched Operation Lorraine to relieve the Việt Minh pressure in the T'ai region and to serve as a diversion while Nà Sản was being built. The operation, led by General François de Linares, started on 9 November and lasted until 19 November. While the operation was going on, General Salan tasked Colonel Jean Gilles with establishing an entrenched fire support base at Nà Sản to stop Giáp's offensive.

Terrain
Nà Sản, located on Route Provinciale 41 (RP 41), was a valley of 2 km × 1 km surrounded by 24 hills that could serve as natural defense positions. In early October 1952, there was a single outpost and a short airstrip, both guarded by a company under the command of a non-commissioned officer. General Salan used the Hanoi-based French Air Force Dakotas to transport troops and material there in order to complete a fortified "base aero-terrestre" or air-land base allowing a direct confrontation with the Việt Minh divisions.

Prelude

Planning
During the battle, Colonel Gilles used a new tactic, called "the hedgehog" (le hérisson), for the first time in Indochina. The hedgehog defense consisted of an outpost surrounded by several armed positions (point d'appui or P.A.). The objective was to provoke an enemy frontal assault, rather than fighting off hit-and-run attacks or falling into ambushes. Nà Sản's hedgehog consisted of 30 P.A. with a complicated trench system, enforced with barbed wires. Its defense forces consisted of 11 battalions (15,000 men) and 6 artillery batteries.

Opposing forces

Franco-Vietnamese forces at Nà Sản
Colonel Jean Gilles, Nà Sản Commander

 Groupement Lansade
 2nd battalion, 1st Algerian Light Infantry Regiment (II/1er Régiment de tirailleurs algériens)
 3rd battalion, 3rd Foreign Infantry Regiment (III/3e régiment étranger d'infanterie), commandant Favreau
 2nd battalion, 6th Moroccan Light Infantry Regiment (II/6e Régiment de tirailleurs marocains)

 Groupement mobile Vietnamien (Vietnamese Mobile Group)
 1st Thai Battalion (BM/BT 1)
 2nd Thai Battalion (BT 2)
 3rd Thai Battalion (BT 3), commandant Vaudrey
 55th BVN (55e Bataillon Vietnamien), capitaine Phạm Văn Đồng
 3rd Battalion, 5th Foreign Infantry Regiment (III/5e régiment étranger d'infanterie), chef de bataillon Dufour

 Groupement parachutiste (Airborne Group)
Lieutenant colonel Ducourneau
 1st Foreign Airborne Battalion (1er bataillon étranger de parachutistes or 1e BEP), chef de bataillon Brothier
 2nd Foreign Airborne Battalion (2e bataillon étranger de parachutistes or 2e BEP), chef de bataillon Bloch
 3rd Colonial Airborne Battalion (3e bataillon de parachutistes coloniaux or 3e BPC), capitaine Bonnigal

 Artillerie (Artillery)
 5th Vietnamese Artillery Group (5e GAVN with 2 batteries of 105 howitzers)
 41st Colonial Artillery Regiment (41e régiment d'artillerie coloniale)
 Foreign Legion Mortar Company (CMLE had one section with four 120 mm guns and one section with six 81 mm mortars)

 Génie (Engineer)
Commandant Casso
 6 sections (2 companies)

Air support

 Aéronaval
 8th flotilla (Privateer)
 9th flotilla (SB2C Helldiver)
 12th flotilla (Hellcat)

 Armée de l'air (Air Force)
 Gascogne 1/19 Bombing Group (B-26)

Việt Minh attacking forces
General Võ Nguyên Giáp, Commander of the Tai region Campaign

 Dai doan 308 (Division 308)
Commander : Colonel Vuong Thua Tu
 Regiment 36
 Regiment 88
 Regiment 102

 Dai doan 312 (Division 312)
Commander : Colonel Lê Trọng Tấn
 Regiment 141
 Regiment 165
 Regiment 209

 Dai doan 316 (Division 316)
Commander : Colonel Le Quang Ba
 Regiment 98
 Regiment 174
 Regiment 176

Battle

On 23 November at 20:00 Việt Minh forces from the 88/308 twice attacked at P.A. 8 and were twice pushed back by the entrenched Franco-Vietnamese troops.

From 24 to 30 November Việt Minh forces made night attacks on different points to test French defense.  During the days, defending troops patrolled within their fire-support range for reconnaissance.

At 20:00 on 30 November, Việt Minh forces from 9 battalions attacked P.A. 22 bis and 24, respectively located east and west of the entrenched headquarters. P.A. 22 bis, defended by a company of the 2nd Thai battalion (BT2) was overrun by the 115th battalion (165/312) after nine hours of relentless attacks, of the 225 men defending the P.A., only one squad was able to escape back to the airfield.  P.A. 24 resisted three hours of constant attacks by the 102/308 before surrendering.

Colonel Gilles, who wanted to take back the two points so close to Nà Sản's headquarters, launched a counter-attack at dawn on 1 December. After a barrage of artillery fire, two companies of the 2e BEP stormed and took back 22 bis. After 7 hard-fought hours, the 3e BPC took back P.A. 24. At 9:00 PM, General Giap's forces launched their all out offensive at Nà Sản. Wave after wave of soldiers relentlessly assaulted several P.A.s, especially 21 bis and 26; sometimes the attackers outnumbered the defenders fifteen to one. All night, Dakotas dropped flares over the battlefields to give support troops visibility to defend the positions. Defending forces continuously fired their cannons into Việt Minh human waves while B-26s, Hellcats and Privateers dropped bombs and napalm onto enemy attack waves and positions. The battles raged on until mid-morning on 2 December when all attacks abruptly stopped, leaving behind an eerie silence.

Aftermath
On 4 December after nearly two weeks of trying to overrun Nà Sản, General Giap withdrew his troops leaving behind 1,544 dead and 1,932 wounded prisoners. The defending Franco-Vietnamese forces lost close to two battalions.

Despite the victory, France was looking for a political solution to get out of Indochina and Nà Sản was abandoned in August 1953.  The tactician Colonel Gilles again outmaneuvered General Giap by evacuating the whole camp without a single loss.  In "Ba sinh hương lửa", Doan Quoc Sy quoted a Việt Minh officer with the forces surrounding Nà Sản, "The enemy withdrew without our knowledge ... until there was only one battalion left ... the enemy was able to escape and save its entire forces because of our poor military intelligence".

The hedgehog tactics earned the French a victory at Nà Sản. As a result, the hedgehog defense became standard practice, and was applied on a larger scale at Điện Biên Phủ. The French hoped that by repeating the strategy on a much larger scale, they would be able to lure Giáp into committing the bulk of his forces in a massed assault. This would enable superior French artillery, armour and air support to decimate the exposed Viet Minh forces.

After the battle, Võ Nguyên Giáp argued that the failure to overrun the base could not have been due to fatigue or because the units were no longer properly organized due to weeks of fighting. Giáp believed that the only possible justification was that the French “hedgehog” was a new defensive class and, because his units had not come across such a cluster of entrenched camps before, they did not know how to destroy it. He noted that with the hedgehog, the French could exploit the fact that it was impossible for the Việt Minh to maintain a great number of combatants in the mountain and forest areas for a long time, because of the eventual shortage of food and limited means of transport. The French had only to wait for the Việt Minh to withdrawal, and then move from their cluster of entrenched camps to reoccupy the abandoned posts. The cluster of entrenched camps had become a new challenge for the advance of his army.

Quotes
 "... Souhaitons que Giap commette l'erreur d'y venir!" ("Let's wish that Giap makes the mistake by coming!"). —Bảo Đại
 "... sans elle (l'aviation), Nà Sản n’était pas possible et je perdais la bataille du Nord-Ouest -" ( ... without it [air-support], Nà Sản would not be possible and I would've lost the Northwest battle). —Raoul Salan
 "... it (the battle) wasn't a defeat—but we suffered losses."  Võ Nguyên Giáp
 "Nous ne sommes pas entamés! Ca tient partout! C’est un déluge de feu indescriptible. ("We have not been breached! All (positions) hold! It is an indescribable deluge of fire.") —Jean Gilles

See also
Battle of Route Coloniale 4
Battle of the Day River
Operation Lorraine
Battle of Dien Bien Phu

References

Bibliography

External links
Views upon Indo-China #4: Na San, a battle in the jungle, French Army Cinematographic Service (SCA#64), 7 May 1953
Full film in HD https://m.youtube.com/watch?v=TCaLV22oHQ8
 The battle of Na San, October–December 1952, R. Vercken & P. Gras (airforce in the battle)

Conflicts in 1952
1952 in French Indochina
1952 in Vietnam
Battles involving Vietnam
Battles involving France
Battles and operations of the First Indochina War
History of Sơn La Province
November 1952 events in Asia
December 1952 events in Asia